Ballenger is a surname. Notable people with the surname include:

A. F. Ballenger (1861–1921), Seventh-day Adventist Minister who started the "Receive Ye the Holy Ghost" movement
Bill Ballenger (born 1941), American politician
Cass Ballenger (1926–2015), American politician
Frank Ballenger, American football coach in the United States
Pelham Ballenger (1894–1948), Major League Baseball third baseman, for at least a week, with the Washington Senators in 1928
Roger Ballenger, Oklahoma Senator from District 8, which includes McIntosh, Okfuskee, Okmulgee and Tulsa counties, since 2006
William S. Ballenger Sr. (1866–1951), American businessman

See also
Ballenger Building in downtown Columbia, Missouri was listed by the National Register of Historic Places in 2004
Ballenger Creek, tributary of the Monocacy River in Frederick County, Maryland
Ballenger Creek, Maryland, census-designated place (CDP) in Frederick County, Maryland, United States
Ballinger (disambiguation)